The title News Hour or NewsHour may refer to:

 Newshour, the BBC World Service radio flagship programme that premiered in 1988
 Newshour (2006 TV programme), a rolling international news and sports programme on Al Jazeera English that premiered in 2006
 News Hour (Canadian TV program), related local Canadian newscast programs that air on Global, with sister programs such as Noon News Hour and News Hour Final
 News Hour (UK TV programme), a 1993–2009 British breakfast television news programme that aired on GMTV/ITV
 PBS NewsHour, an American television news program that has been broadcast on PBS since 1975
 PVO NewsDay, an Australian news programme formerly titled PVO NewsHour